Paxton is a census-designated place (CDP) in Plumas County, California, United States. The population was 14 at the 2010 census, down from 21 at the 2000 census.

History
Paxton was once called Soda Bar. A post office called Paxton was established in 1917, and remained in operation until 1952.

Geography
Paxton is located at  (40.036559, -120.995701).

Demographics

2010
At the 2010 census Paxton had a population of 14. The racial makeup of Paxton was 14 (100.0%) White, 0 (0.0%) African American, 0 (0.0%) Native American, 0 (0.0%) Asian, 0 (0.0%) Pacific Islander, 0 (0.0%) from other races, and 0 (0.0%) from two or more races. Hispanic or Latino of any race were 4 people (28.6%).

The whole population lived in households, no one lived in non-institutionalized group quarters and no one was institutionalized.

There were 8 households, 1 (12.5%) had children under the age of 18 living in them, 2 (25.0%) were opposite-sex married couples living together, 0 (0%) had a female householder with no husband present, 0 (0%) had a male householder with no wife present.  There were 0 (0%) unmarried opposite-sex partnerships, and 0 (0%) same-sex married couples or partnerships. 6 households (75.0%) were one person and 1 (12.5%) had someone living alone who was 65 or older. The average household size was 1.75.  There were 2 families (25.0% of households); the average family size was 3.50.

The age distribution was 3 people (21.4%) under the age of 18, 1 people (7.1%) aged 18 to 24, 3 people (21.4%) aged 25 to 44, 6 people (42.9%) aged 45 to 64, and 1 people (7.1%) who were 65 or older.  The median age was 44.5 years. For every 100 females, there were 250.0 males.  For every 100 females age 18 and over, there were 266.7 males.

There were 14 housing units at an average density of 42.0 per square mile, of the occupied units 1 (12.5%) were owner-occupied and 7 (87.5%) were rented. The homeowner vacancy rate was 0%; the rental vacancy rate was 30.0%.  6 people (42.9% of the population) lived in owner-occupied housing units and 8 people (57.1%) lived in rental housing units.

2000
At the 2000 census there were 21 people, 9 households, and 5 families in the CDP. The racial makeup of the CDP was 95.24% White and 4.76% Native American. Hispanic or Latino of any race were 9.52%.

Of the 9 households 44.4% had children under the age of 18 living with them, 44.4% were married couples living together, 11.1% had a female householder with no husband present, and 44.4% were non-families. 44.4% of households were one person and none had someone living alone who was 65 or older. The average household size was 2.33 and the average family size was 3.40.

The age distribution was 38.1% under the age of 18, 38.1% from 25 to 44, 23.8% from 45 to 64, . The median age was 28 years. For every 100 females, there were 110.0 males. For every 100 females age 18 and over, there were 160.0 males.

The median household income was $56,250 and the median family income  was $56,250. Males had a median income of $43,750 versus $0 for females. The per capita income for the CDP was $11,621. None of the population and none of the families were below the poverty line.

Politics

References

Census-designated places in Plumas County, California
Census-designated places in California